David Kennerly may refer to:
 David Hume Kennerly (born 1947), Pulitzer Prize–winning photographer
 David Ethan Kennerly, role-playing game author